This is a partial list of notable puzzle video games, sorted by general category.

Tile matching

Tile-matching video games are a type of puzzle video game where the player manipulates tiles in order to make them disappear according to a matching criterion. There are a great number of variations on this theme.

Falling block puzzles
Puzzle pieces advance into the play area from one or more edges, typically falling into the play area from above. Player must match or arrange individual pieces to achieve the particular objectives defined by each game.
Alien Hive
Baku Baku Animal
Blueprint 3D
Clockwiser
Columns
Dialhex
Dr. Mario
Drop Mania
Faces
Klax
Lumines
Meteos
Pnickies
Puyo Puyo
Super Puzzle Fighter II Turbo
Rampage Puzzle Attack
Super Swap
Tactic
Tecmo Stackers
Tetris
Trioncube
Uo Poko
Wario's Woods
Welltris
Wordtris
Yoshi

Advancing blocks puzzles
Block-shaped puzzle pieces advance onto the board from one or more edges (i.e. top, bottom, or sides). The player tries to prevent the blocks from reaching the opposite edge of the playing area.
Ball Fighter
Collapse
Critter Crunch
Frozen Bubble
Luxor series
Magical Drop
Magnetica
Money Puzzle Exchanger
Puzzle League series
Poker Smash
Puzzle Bobble (a.k.a. Bust-a-Move)
Puzzle Link, Puzzle Link 2
Quarth
Snood
Starsweep
TiQal, also a rising block game
Zuma

Other matching puzzles
2048
Alchemy
Bejeweled
GNUbik
Godzilla: Smash3
Gunpey
Gyromancer
Hexic
HuniePop, HuniePop 2: Double Date
Loopz
Lumines, Lumines II
MNUM2
Perception
Plotting
Puchi Puchi Virus
Puzzle Quest: Challenge of the Warlords, Puzzle Quest: Galactrix, Puzzle Quest 2
Puzznic
Rainbow Web
SameGame
Sega Swirl
Swing
Wind and Water: Puzzle Battles
Yoshi's Cookie
Yosumin DS
Zoop
Zoo Keeper

Logic puzzles
Atsumari
Colour Cross
Mario's Picross
POP4
Strimko
Sudoku Gridmaster

Hidden object
Black Box
Criminal Case
Drawn series
Mystery Case Files series
Minesweeper, MineSweeper3D

Obstacle course navigation
A Good Snowman Is Hard To Build
Archer Maclean's Mercury
Atomix
Baba Is You
Ballance
Bomberman
Castlequest
ChuChu Rocket!
Dash Galaxy in the Alien Asylum
English Country Tune
Enigma
Flamin' Finger
iWing Maze 2
Kumoon
Kuru Kuru Kururin
Kururin Paradise
Kye
Lasertank
Marble Drop
Marble Madness
Navigator
Oxyd
Patrick's Parabox
Pico Park
Polarium
Pretentious Game
Puzzle Dimension
Rush Hour
Sokoban
Sokobond
SokoSolve
Switchball
Theseus and the Minotaur
XOR

Single character control
Adventures of Lolo and the Eggerland series
Antichamber
Banana
Bobby Carrot
BoxBoy! series
Boxxle
Braid
Bombuzal
Boulderdash
Buster Bros. series
Closure
Deadly Rooms of Death
Eets
Enigma Prison
Faraway series
Incredipede
Intelligent Qube
Interphase
Journey to the Planets
Kickle Cubicle
Krusty's Fun House
Kula World
Kwirk
Limbo
Lode Runner
Magical Puzzle Popils
Mind: Path to Thalamus
Moai-kun
Mole Mania
Myst series
Narbacular Drop
Oddworld series
Please, Don't Touch Anything
Pneuma: Breath of Life
Portal, Portal 2
Pitman
Pushmo series
Pushover
Q.U.B.E.
Quantum Conundrum
Repton
Return of the Obra Dinn
Scratches
Scribblenauts
Sheep, Dog, 'n' Wolf
Solomon's Key and its sequel, Fire 'n Ice
Stacking
Superliminal
Sutte Hakkun
Taiji
The Swapper
The Talos Principle
The Turing Test (video game)
The White Door
The Witness
Toki Tori
Unmechanical

Multiple character control
Dumb Little Creatures
Echochrome, Echochrome 2
Gobliiins!
Pingus
Pitman (a.k.a. Catrap)
The Brainies
The Lost Vikings
Scarab Tales

Lemmings series
3D Lemmings
All New World of Lemmings
Christmas Lemmings
Lemmings
Lemmings 2: The Tribes
Lemmings Revolution
Oh No! More Lemmings

Construction
Armadillo Run
Amazing Alex
Bridge Craft Story
Bridge Constructor
Crazy Machines, Crazy Machines 2
Elefunk
Fantastic Contraption (2008 video game)
Fantastic Contraption (2016 video game)
Pipe Mania
Poly Bridge, Poly Bridge 2, Poly Bridge 3
The Incredible Machine
World of Goo

Algorithmic
7 Billion Humans
Human Resource Machine
KOHCTPYKTOP: Engineer of the People
Manufactoria
SpaceChem
The Codex of Alchemical Engineering

Multiple puzzle types
3 in Three
Azada
Big Brain Academy
Blue Toad Murder Files
Brain Age: Train Your Brain in Minutes a Day!
Castles (video game)
Castle Breakout
Dr. Brain series
Faraway: Puzzle Escape
Machinarium
MILO
Professor Layton series
Puzzle Agent, Puzzle Agent 2
Puzzle Panic
Safecracker: The Ultimate Puzzle Adventure
Smart Games Challenge series
The 7th Guest
The 11th Hour
The Daedalus Encounter
The Dig
The Fool's Errand
WarioWare, Inc.
Yohoho! Puzzle Pirates

Collections
Microsoft Entertainment Pack
Microsoft Entertainment Pack: The Puzzle Collection
Zillions of Games

Other
Check Man
Chocolate Castle
Chromatron
CrossworDS (NDS)
Cube Escape
Cube Loop
Cubicks
Cuyo (game)
Devil Dice
enDice
Every Extend Extra
Flow Free
Gemsweeper
Kula World
Logos Panic
Mr Driller
Photo Spot
Shanghai solitaire
UFO: A Day in the Life
Wheel of Fortune (video game)

References 

Puzzle